HNLMS Overijssel (D815) was a destroyer of the . The ship was in service with the Royal Netherlands Navy from 1957 to 1982. The destroyer was named after the Dutch province of Overijssel and was the twelfth ship with this name. In 1982 the ship was taken out of service and sold to Peru where it was  renamed Coronel Bolognesi.

Design
The s were an improved and larger derivative of the previous , with more powerful machinery and heavier anti-aircraft armament. Like the Hollands, they were specialised escort ships, intended to defend convoys and task forces against hostile submarines and air attack.

Displacement was  standard and  full load. Unusually for destroyer-type ships, the Frieslands were fitted with side and deck armour to protect against splinter damage from near-misses by bombs. The ship had a crew of 284officers and other ranks.

As built, Overijssel had a main gun armament of two twin Bofors 120 mm (4.7 in) automatic dual-purpose guns, with a close-in anti-aircraft armament of six Bofors 40 mm guns, four grouped around the mainmast and two forward of the ship's bridge. Anti-submarine armament consisted of two quadruple launchers for Bofors 375mm anti submarine rockets and two depth charge racks. In 1961, Overijssel was fitted with eight fixed 533 mm (21 inch) torpedo tubes for anti-submarine torpedoes, but these were unsuccessful and were removed by 1962. The two 40 mm guns forward of the bridge were removed in 1965 and the fire control systems for the remaining 40 mm guns removed in 1977–78.

Dutch service history
HNLMS Overijssel was one of eight s and was built at the Wilton-Fijenoord in Schiedam. The ship was laid down on 15 October 1953 and was launched on 8 August 1955. Overijssel was put into service on 4 October 1957.
On 1 July 1958 Overijssel departed from Den Helder to Dutch New Guinea. It reached Sorong on 7 August 1958 via the Suez Canal and Singapore. In November 1959 the ship returned to Den Helder.

In 1962 Overijssel again served in Dutch New Guinea. After the signing of the New York Agreement, Overijssel sailed the Sorong-Biak route several times and again to remove troops from the army.

On 14 November 1962 the ship left Biak as the last Dutch navy ship to leave Dutch New Guinea (Biak), returning to the Netherlands via the Suez Canal.

On 8 June 1977 Overijssel, with the frigate , the replenishment ship  and destroyer , visited Leningrad. This was the first Dutch squadron to visit Leningrad in twenty one years.

Overijssel was guardship for the 1979 Fastnet race, the last of five races of the Admiral's Cup. When severe weather hit the race on 13 and 14 August, the ship participated in rescue operations, both acting as a communications relay and directly rescuing the crews of yachts that had sunk or were in distress. Overijssel rescued survivors from three yachts as well as recovering several dead bodies.

The ships returned to Den Helder on 19 May 1982.

On 11 June 1982 the vessel was decommissioned and sold to the Peruvian Navy.

Peruvian service history

The ship was commissioned into the Peruvian Navy on 14 June 1982 where the ship was renamed Coronel Bolognesi with the pennant number 70. The ship was decommissioned in 1990.

Notes

References

Friesland-class destroyers
1955 ships
Ships built by Wilton-Fijenoord
Destroyers of the Cold War